The National Indigenous Music Awards 2021 were the forthcoming 18th annual National Indigenous Music Awards. They were scheduled to occur on 8 August 2021 at the Darwin Amphitheatre however on 28 July 2021, were postponed until further notice due to the COVID-19 pandemic in Australia. On 11 October 2021, it was announced the NIMAs have partnered with triple j and its First Nations show, Blak Out to create a two-hour special on 14 November 2021.

Creative Director Ben Graetz said "2021 will bring the event to Australia across many platforms, led by our long-time partners NITV, while creating a special night of connection under the stars here on Larrakia Country."

The nominees were announced on 8 July 2021.

Performers
Performers announced to perform as of May 2021,
 Baker Boy
 Miiesha
 Electric Fields
 King Stingray
 Dallas Woods and Kee'Ahn
 Alice Skye

Hall of Fame inductee
 Kev Carmody

Triple J Unearthed National Indigenous Winner

Archie Roach Foundation Award

Awards
The nominations and winners

Artist of the Year

New Talent of the Year

Album of the Year

Film Clip of the Year

Song of the Year

Community Clip of the Year

Indigenous Language Award

References

2021 in Australian music
2021 music awards
National Indigenous Music Awards